The Ohio Dominican Panthers are the athletic teams that represent Ohio Dominican University, located in Columbus, Ohio, in NCAA Division II intercollegiate sporting competitions. The Panthers compete as members of the Great Midwest Athletic Conference beginning in 2017. Ohio Dominican joined the Great Lakes Intercollegiate Athletic Conference in 2010 as part of its transition to NCAA Division II from the National Association of Intercollegiate Athletics (NAIA).

Varsity teams

List of teams

Men's sports (7)
Baseball
Basketball
Cross country
Football
Golf
Soccer
Track and field

Women's sports (7)
Basketball
Cross country
Golf
Soccer
Softball
Track and field
Volleyball

References

External links
 

 
Sports teams in Columbus, Ohio